Finnair Flight 405 was a scheduled domestic passenger flight between Oulu and Helsinki, Finland, that was hijacked on September 30, 1978. The Finnair Sud Aviation Caravelle with 44 passengers and 5 crew aboard was hijacked by an unemployed home building contractor. After forcing the pilot to fly to Amsterdam, Netherlands, and Helsinki, the hijacker received his ransom demands and released his hostages. He was arrested at his home the following day.

The 2013 Finnish drama film The Hijack That Went South, directed by Aleksi Mäkelä, has been made on the basis of the case.

Hijacking 
Flight 405 was a regularly scheduled domestic passenger flight operated by Finnair between Oulu Airport and Helsinki Airport. On September 30, 1978, the flight was serviced by a Sud Aviation SE-210 Caravelle.

Aarno Lamminparras, a 37-year-old unemployed home building contractor who had recently declared bankruptcy, boarded the aircraft in Oulu. Since Finnish airports did not perform security checks on domestic flights, he was able to carry a loaded Walther 7.65mm pistol aboard. At approximately 16:00, while en route to Helsinki, Lamminparras entered the cockpit and held the pilot at gunpoint. The aircraft continued to Helsinki, where 34 of the passengers were released.

Lamminparras subsequently forced the pilot to fly back to Oulu where the aircraft circled the airport for several hours before landing to refuel. A US$ 168,000 ransom payment from Finnair was also loaded onto the plane. The plane was then flown back to Helsinki, where Lamminparras demanded $38,000 from Helsingin Sanomat, Finland's largest newspaper. The newspaper paid approximately $18,000, and the remaining eleven passengers were freed.

The aircraft then flew to Amsterdam, where it landed at Schiphol Airport and refueled. It then returned to Helsinki and received the remainder of the newspaper's ransom payment. The Caravelle then continued on to Oulu.

Lamminparras's final demands included four bottles of whiskey, a chauffeured limousine, and 24 hours alone at home with his wife. After police agreed to his demands, Lamminparras released the final three hostages, all of them crewmembers. He agreed to surrender peacefully Monday morning.

Oulu police stormed Lamminparras's house and arrested him on Sunday October 1. A police spokesman indicated that law enforcement officers had tapped the hijacker's home phone, and that he had made several phone calls that implied he did not plan to surrender peacefully as he had initially agreed. He was sentenced to seven years' imprisonment in 1979.

See also 

 Aircraft hijacking
 List of aircraft hijackings
 The Hijack That Went South

References 

Aircraft hijackings
Accidents and incidents involving the Sud Aviation Caravelle
405
1978 in Finland
Aviation accidents and incidents in 1978
September 1978 events in Europe